Karl Fyodorovich Knorring (22 May 1746 - 12 February 1820) was a Lieutenant-general of the Russian Empire, who served as the Inspector of the Caucasian Line from March 1799 to late 1802. He played an important role in the incorporation of Eastern Georgia (Kartli-Kakheti) into the Russian Empire. He was dismissed as a result of being unable to make the area stable, as well as the corruption of his appointed officials. He died after 1805.

References

Sources 
 

Russian nobility
Imperial Russian Army generals
1746 births
1820 deaths
People from Järva County
People from the Governorate of Estonia
Baltic-German people
Recipients of the Order of St. George of the Fourth Degree
Recipients of the Order of St. Anna, 1st class
Russian military personnel of the Caucasian War
Burials at Vvedenskoye Cemetery